Jurandir de Freitas (12 November 1940 – 6 March 1996), nicknamed Jurandir, was a Brazilian footballer.

He earned 15 cups for the Brazil national football team. He was part of the 1962 FIFA World Cup winning squad, but he did not play any matches during the tournament. During his club career he played for Corinthians, São Bento, São Paulo, Marília, Operário-MT, Amparo-SP and União de Mogi.

References

1940 births
1996 deaths
People from Marília
Brazilian footballers
São Paulo FC players
Sport Club Corinthians Paulista players
Brazil international footballers
1962 FIFA World Cup players
FIFA World Cup-winning players
Association football defenders
Footballers from São Paulo (state)